The 1989 Atlanta Falcons season was the franchise’s 24th season in the National Football League (NFL). The Falcons drafted Deion Sanders with their first round pick in the NFL Draft. Marion Campbell retired after the twelfth game of the season.

Despite having Sanders in their defensive backfield, the Falcons surrendered 7.59 yards per pass attempt (including quarterback sacks) in 1989, one of the ten worst totals in NFL history.

The latter part of the season was marred by two tragedies. On November 24, rookie offensive tackle Ralph Norwood was killed in an automobile accident eight miles from the Falcons’ training facilities. Just under a month later, on December 19, backup tight end Brad Beckman was also killed in an auto accident. It marked the death of three players of the team in the space of two seasons (the previous year, cornerback David Croudip died of an overdose).

Offseason

NFL Draft

Personnel

Staff

Roster

Regular season

Schedule

Game Summaries

Week 9

This would be the final win of the season for Atlanta.

Standings

Awards and records 
 Shawn Collins, led all NFL rookie wide receivers in receptions (58)

Milestones 
The Falcons drew a franchise-low attendance of 7,792 for their finale, a 31–24 loss to the Detroit Lions on December 24.

References

External links 
 1989 Atlanta Falcons at Pro-Football-Reference.com

Atlanta
Atlanta Falcons seasons
Atlanta Falcons